Mopani is one of the 5 districts of Limpopo province of South Africa. The seat of Mopani is Giyani. According to the 2016 Community Survey it has a population of 1,159,185. The district code is DC33. After the 12th amendment of the Constitution of South Africa part of the area of the Bohlabela district was incorporated into Mopani.

Geography

Neighbours 
Mopani is surrounded by:
 the republic of Mozambique to the east
 Ehlanzeni (DC32) to the south
 Sekhukhune (DC35) to the south-west
 Capricorn (DC35) to the west
 Vhembe (DC34) to the north

Local municipalities 
The district contains the following local municipalities:

Demographics
The following statistics are from the Community Survey 2016.

Gender

Ethnic group

Age

Politics

Election results
The following results are for the direct proportional representation election of members of the Mopani District Council on 3 August 2016.

See also
 Municipal Demarcation Board

References

External links
 Mopani DM Official website

District municipalities of Limpopo
Mopani District Municipality